The Class D50 is a type of 2-8-2 steam locomotive built by the Japanese Government Railways (JGR), the Japanese National Railways (JNR) and various manufacturers from 1923 to 1931. The class name indicates that the locomotive has four sets of driving wheels (D) and belongs to one of the classes of tender locomotive allocated a number in the series 50 to 99 in the Japan Railways locomotive numbering and classification scheme of 1928. Hideo Shima designed the rest of the Class until 1931. 

The design of the D50 was based on the JNR Class 9600 which was introduced in 1916. A total of 380 Class D50 locomotives were built. Between 1951 and 1956 78 were rebuilt to Class D60  2-8-4 Berkshire’s by the JNR . This class would later form the JNR Class D51 .

Service in China

Manchukuo National Railway

In 1923, sixteen D50 class locomotives were exported to the Jichang Jidun Railway in Manchuria, which designated them class 500 and numbered 501 through 516. Ten were built by Kawasaki (works nos. 970−971, 1140−1170) and six by Kisha Seizō (w/n 965−970), and though very similar to the Japanese D50 class, there were some slight differences in dimensions due to the larger loading gauge on Chinese lines. After the establishment of Manchukuo, the Jichang Jidun Railway was nationalised along with other private railways to form the Manchukuo National Railway. The MNR classified these Mikana (ミカナ) class, numbered 6540−6555, renumbered 501−516 in 1938. After the establishment of the People's Republic of China, China Railways designated them ㄇㄎ5 (MK5) class in 1951, and subsequently 解放5 (JF5) class in 1959.

Central China Railway
In 1939, D50 193 was converted to standard gauge and shipped to the Central China Railway, where it operated primarily between Nanjing and Shanghai. This engine lasted in service on China Railways until 1955.

China Railways
After the establishment of the People's Republic of China, all the railways of China were taken over by the China Railway, which classified the D50s as ㄇㄎ16 (MK16) class in 1951, later becoming class 解放16(JF16).

Preserved examples
Two D50s are preserved in Japan.
 D50 25　Park in Kitami, Hokkaido
 D50 140 At the Umekoji Steam Locomotive Museum in Kyoto

See also
 Japan Railways locomotive numbering and classification
JNR Class 9600
JNR Class D51
JNR Class D52
JNR Class D60
JNR Class D61
JNR Class D62

References

1067 mm gauge locomotives of Japan
Steam locomotives of Japan
Steam locomotives of China
Standard gauge locomotives of China
2-8-2 locomotives
Hitachi locomotives
Kawasaki locomotives
Preserved steam locomotives of Japan
Railway locomotives introduced in 1923
1′D1′ h2 locomotives
Freight locomotives